The Urban community of Nice Côte d'Azur (French: communauté urbaine Nice Côte d'Azur), is the former intercommunal structure gathering the city of Nice (France) and some of its suburbs. It was created in December 2008.

The Urban community of Nice Côte d'Azur encompasses essentially the eastern part of the metropolitan area of Nice (see infobox at Nice article for the metropolitan area), the western communes of the metropolitan area around Cannes and Antibes having refused to join in.

Those parts of the metropolitan area that are not inside the Community have formed different intercommunal structures, such as:
 Communauté d'agglomération de Sophia Antipolis, with Antibes and Valbonne in it
 Communauté d'agglomération du Moyen Pays Provençal
 Communauté de communes du Pays des Paillons
 etc.

On 1 January 2012, the urban community and three communities of communes merged becoming the Metropolis Nice Côte d'Azur.

Communes
The Communauté urbaine comprised the following communes:

 Aspremont
 Beaulieu-sur-Mer
 Cagnes-sur-Mer
 Cap-d'Ail
 Carros
 Castagniers
 Coaraze
 Colomars
 Duranus
 Èze
 Falicon
 La Gaude
 Lantosque
 Levens
 Nice
 La Roquette-sur-Var
 Saint-André-de-la-Roche
 Saint-Blaise
 Saint-Jean-Cap-Ferrat
 Saint-Jeannet
 Saint-Laurent-du-Var
 Saint-Martin-du-Var
 Tourrette-Levens
 La Trinité
 Utelle
 Vence
 Villefranche-sur-Mer

References

External links
  Official website

Nice Cote d'Azur
Alpes-Maritimes
Nice